The M281 is a straight-three petrol engine produced by Mercedes-Benz since 2014.

Design 
The M281 uses an aluminium alloy cylinder block and head, and features a dual overhead camshaft with 4 valves per cylinder. These engines are used in Smart, Renault, Nissan, and Dacia models due to Daimler A.G.'s involvement in the Renault–Nissan–Mitsubishi Alliance since 2010.

Models

M281 E10 R 
 2014–2019 C453/A453 Smart Fortwo
 2014–2019 W453 Smart Forfour

M281 E10 (Nissan HR10DE/Renault H4D) 
 2014–2019 C453/A453 Smart Fortwo
 2014–2019 W453 Smart Forfour
 2014–present Renault Twingo III
 2017–2020 Dacia Sandero II 1.0 SCe
 2017–2020 Dacia Logan II 1.0 SCe
 2017–present K14 Nissan Micra 1.0

M281 E09 LA (Nissan HR09DET/Renault H4Bt) 
 2014–2019 C453/A453 Smart Fortwo
 2014–2019 W453 Smart Forfour
 2014–present Renault Twingo III
 2014–2020 Dacia Sandero II 0.9 TCe
 2014–2020 Dacia Logan II 0.9 TCe
 2017–present K14 Nissan Micra 1.0
 2014-2019 Renault Clio IV 0.9

References 

Mercedes-Benz engines
Straight-three engines
Gasoline engines by model